Carl Norac (born 29 June 1960) is a Walloon Belgian author of children's books and poetry.

Biography
Carl Norac was born in Mons, Belgium in 1960, as the son of poet Pierre Coran and comedian Irène Coran. In 1968, they moved to the small village Erbisoeul, now a part of Jurbise. He studied in Liège and became a teacher of French, but quit after two years. For the next six years, he travelled around the world, while working as a writer. His poetry collection Le maintien du désordre was awarded the Prix Robert Goffin. After witnessing an eruption of the Krakatau in 1993, he published Nemo et le volcan: with illustrations by Louis Joos, which was rewarded the Pomme d'Or, the European illustration award.

In 1996, he became a Professor of Literature at the Royal Conservatorium of Mons, a theatre school. In 1999, he moved to France, and the same year his daughter Else was born. By 2000, he was a full-time writer, mainly creating juvenile illustrated fiction.

Bibliography

In English
1998: I love you so much, Macdonald young books
1999: I love to cuddle, Random House
2000: Hello sweetie pie, Random House
2004: My Daddy is a Giant, ill. Ingrid Godon, Macmillan
2006: My Mummy is Magic, ill. Ingrid Godon, Macmillan
2007: Tell Me a Story, Mummy, ill. Mei Matsuoka, Macmillan
2007: My Grandpa is a Champion, ill. Ingrid Godon, Macmillan
2007: Monster, Don't Eat Me!, ill. Carll Cneut, Groundwood Books
2008: My Grandma is a Star, ill. Ingrid Godon, Macmillan
2009: Big Bear, Little Brother, ill. Kristin Oftedal, Macmillan

Complete

Poetry
1990: Images en voie d’arrestation, Maison Internationale de la Poésie, Bruxelles.
1990: Le maintien du désordre, Caractères, Paris.
1993: La politesse des fauves, Éditions l’Arbre à paroles, Amay
1994: Dimanche aux Hespérides, Éditions de la Différence, coll. Littérature, Paris.
1995: Le voyeur libre, Éditions des Eperonniers, Bruxelles.
1996: La candeur, Éditions de la Différence, coll. Littérature, Paris.
1998: Le carnet de Montréal, Éditions le Noroît, Montréal.
1999: Éloge de la patience, Éditions de la Différence, Paris.
2003: Le carnet bleu, Renaissance du livre, Tournai.
2003: Métropolitaines, L’escampette, Bordeaux.

Youth poetry
1989: Dis les bruits, with C.Clément and C. Hellings, ill. Dominique Maes, Casterman
2003: Lettres du géant à l’enfant qui passe, Espace Nord, Éditions Labor
2006: Petites grimaces et grands sourires, ill. Dominique Maes, Lo Païs, Éditions du Rocher

Children's literature
1986: Le fantôme à tics, ill. Marie-José Sacré, Dessain, Liège: translated in German, Catalan, Spanish, Italian, Dutch
1986: Bon appétit, Monsieur Logre, ill. Marie-José Sacré, Dessain, Liège: translated in Catalan, Spanish, Italian, Dutch
1987: Harpagonne la sorcière, ill. Marie-José Sacré, Dessain, Liège: translated in German, Italian, Dutch
1987: Baloum le génie, ill. Marie-José Sacré, Dessain, Liège: translated in Italian
1988: Loch Ernest est-il un monstre?, ill. Marie-José Sacré, Dessain, Liège: translated in German, Italian
1990: Le chat catastrophe, ill. Marie-José Sacré, Gakken, Tokyo: translated in Japanese
1991: Le lion fanfaron, ill. Frédéric Du Bus, Casterman, Tournai
1994: Romulus et Rémi, ill. Jean-Claude Hubert, Pastel-Ecole des Loisirs, Paris
1995: Coeur de singe, ill. Jean-Claude Hubert, Pastel-Ecole des Loisirs, Paris
1995: Nemo et le volcan, ill. Louis Joos, Pastel-Ecole des Loisirs, Paris
1996: Un loup dans la nuit bleue, ill. Louis Joos, Pastel-Ecole des Loisirs, Paris
1996: Les mots doux, ill. Claude K. Dubois, Pastel-Ecole des Loisirs, Paris: translated in German, English, Catalan, Korean, Spanish, Finnish, Italian, Dutch, Papiamentu
1997: Lou dans la Lune, ill. Rita Van Bilsen, Artimini, Brussels
1997: Beau comme au cinéma, ill. Louis Joos, Pastel-Ecole des Loisirs, Paris
1998: Le sourire de Kiawak, ill. Louis Joos, Pastel-Ecole des Loisirs, Paris: translated in Korean
1998: L'espoir pélican, ill. Louis Joos, Pastel-Ecole des Loisirs, Paris
1998: L'île aux câlins, ill. Claude K Dubois, Pastel-Ecole des Loisirs, Paris: translated in German, English, Catalan, Spanish, Greek, Japanese, Slovene
1998: Panique cosmique, ill. David Merveille, Artimini, Brussels
1999: La forêt magique, ill. David Merveille, Artimini, Brussels
1999: La Grande Ourse, ill. Kitty Crowther, Pastel-Ecole des Loisirs, Paris: translated in Dutch
1999: Bonjour, mon petit cœur, ill. Claude K Dubois, Pastel-Ecole des Loisirs, Paris: translated in German, English, Catalan, Spanish, Finnish, Japanese, Dutch
2000: Le message de la baleine, ill. Jean-Luc Englebert, Pastel-Ecole des Loisirs
2000: La petite souris d'Halloween, ill. Stibane, Pastel-Ecole des Loisirs, Paris
2000: Marine et Louisa, ill. Claude K Dubois, Pastel-Ecole des Loisirs, Paris
2000: Le rêve de l'ours, ill. Louis Joos, Pastel- Ecole des Loisirs, Paris
2001: Donne-moi un ours, ill. Émile Jadoul, Pastel- École des loisirs: translated in Basque, Catalan, Korean, Spanish
2001: Le Père Noël m’a écrit, ill. Kitty Crowther, Pastel-Ecole des loisirs: translated in Korean
2001: Je veux un bisou, ill. Claude K. Dubois, Ecole des Loisirs: translated in Catalan, Chinese, Spanish, Japanese
2001: Je suis en amour, ill. Claude K. Dubois, Ecole des Loisirs: translated in Catalan, Chinese, Spanish
2001: Le printemps de l’ours, ill. Jean-Luc Englebert, Artimini
2001: Kuli et le sorcier, ill. Dominique Mwankumi, Archimède-Ecole des loisirs
2002: Zeppo, ill. Peter Elliott, Pastel-Ecole des loisirs
2002: Tu m’aimes ou tu m’aimes pas?, ill. Claude K Dubois, Pastel-Ecole des loisirs: translated in Chinese, Japanese, Dutch
2002: Pierrot d’amour, ill. Jean-Luc Englebert, Pastel-Ecole des loisirs
2002: Une visite chez la sorcière, ill. Sophie, Pastel- École des loisirs
2003: Akli, prince du désert, ill. Anne-Catherine De Boel, Pastel-Ecole des loisirs
2003: Tu es si gentil, mon ours, ill. Anne-Isabelle le Touzé, Pastel-Ecole des loisirs: translated in Danish, Italian
2003: Un secret pour grandir, ill. Carll Cneut, Pastel-Ecole des loisirs: translated in Danish, Portuguese
2004: Le petit sorcier de la pluie, ill. Anne-Catherine De Boel, Pastel-Ecole des loisirs
2004: Coeur de papier, ill. Carll Cneut, Pastel-Ecole des loisirs: translated in Italian, Dutch
2004: Angakkeq, la légende de l’oiseau-homme, ill. Louis Joos, Pastel-Ecole des loisirs
2004: Mon papa est un géant, ill. Ingrid Godon, Bayard Editions: translated in English, German, Catalan, Dutch, Swedish
2004: Tout près de Maman, ill. Catherine Pineur, Pastel-Ecole des loisirs
2005: Mon meilleur ami du monde, ill. Claude K Dubois, Pastel
2005: Sentimento, ill. Rebecca Dautremer, Bilboquet
2005: Le Géant de la Grande Tour, ill. Ingrid Godon, Sarbacane
2005: Petit bonheur, ill. Eric Battut, Bilboquet
2006: Et maintenant, qu’est-ce qu’on fait?, ill. Kristien Aertssen, Editions Pastel- L’Ecole des loisirs
2006: Monstre, ne me mange pas!, ill. Carll Cneut, Editions Pastel- L’Ecole des loisirs
2006: La Vie en Bleu, ill. Stéphane Poulin, Editions Pastel- L’Ecole des loisirs
2006: Monsieur Satie, l’homme qui avait un petit piano dans la tête, ill. Elodie Nouhen, Éditions Didier Jeunesse

Youth novels
2002: Le dernier voyage de Saint-Exupéry, ill. Louis Joos, La Renaissance du Livre
2004: Ogronimo et la très petite sorcière, ill. Catherine Fradire, Magnard
2005: Le magicien des ombres, ill. Karen Laborie, collection Tipik, Magnard

Theatre
1999: Le Carnaval des animaux, sur une musique de Saint-Saëns, ill. Gabriel Lefèbvre, Editions de l'Opéra de la Monnaie, Brussels
1999: Monsieur Pwoët, Editions du Cerisier, Cuesmes

Non fiction
1994: Le canal du centre: quand les bateaux prennent l’ascenseur, ill. J. P. Galliez, Casterman, coll. l’histoire à la trace

Comics
1990: A toi de jouer, Diogène, ill. Bernard Godi, Casterman, Tournai

References

External links

Homepage
Short biography and English bibliography at publisher panmacmillan

Living people
1960 births
Belgian children's writers
Belgian male poets